Valle de Guadalupe is a village in Michoacán, Mexico.

References
Valle De Guadalupe Michoacan. Traditionally celebrates the fiesta of Virgen de Guadalupe in January the date  changes every year,what ever the date comes to the second Saturday of the month of January.
Near by is the lake of Camecuaro. 

Populated places in Michoacán